The Guerrero Amuzgo language is an Amuzgo language spoken in southwest Guerrero state in Mexico.

Statistics and history
There are 23,000 speakers, 10,000 that are monolingual. It is also known as Nomndaa or Ñomndaa. It belongs to the Oto-Manguean language family and the Amuzgoan subfamily. The use of the language is widespread and it is learned as a second language by Spanish and Nahuatl speakers living with the Guerrero speakers.

There is a positive cultural affinity toward the tongue and it is used in business, religion, and taught bilingually with Spanish until 6th grade. 10% of adults and 15% of children are literate in Amuzgo Guerrero. There are media such as videos, a dictionary and radio broadcasts in the language that propagate its use.

Phonology

Vowels 

 Sounds /æ, æ̃, æ̰, æ̰̃/ can also fluctuate to more mid sounds [ɛ, ɛ̃, ɛ̰, ɛ̰̃].

Consonants 

Sounds [p, ᵐb, r] only appear in a few words.

Notes

Amuzgos
Guerrero
Indigenous languages of Mexico
Mesoamerican languages
Oto-Pamean languages